Maksim Borisoviç Medvedev (born 29 September 1989) is an Azerbaijani professional footballer who plays as a right-back for and captains both Azerbaijan Premier League club Qarabağ and the Azerbaijan national team.

Medvedev has spent his entire career at Qarabağ since becoming a professional player in 2006 and is the most capped player in the history of the club. He has won the Azerbaijan Premier League eight times and Azerbaijan Cup five times with Qarabağ. Medvedev made his debut for the Azerbaijani national team at the age of 19 and is the second most capped player in the history of the national team. Primarily as a right-back, he can also be utilized as a left-back or centre-back.

Club career
Born in Baku, Azerbaijan SSR (present-day Azerbaijan), Medvedev was a product of the Qarabağ youth system.

International career
Medvedev made his Azerbaijan U21 national team debut in 2008, having previously played for U17 and U19 teams.

He became a regular starter for the senior national team during World Cup 2010 qualifying games after Qarabağ FK's successful Europa League campaign in 2009. On 3 June 2016, Medvedev lead the Azerbaijan national team against Canada as a team captain. He scored his first international goal on 8 October 2016 against Norway, securing a 1–0 victory for his team. After the retirement of Rashad Sadyghov ans Kamran Aghayev from the national team, Medvedev was selected as the new team captain in early 2019. He has led the team as captain in 28 games.

Career statistics

Club

International

Scores and results list Azerbaijan's goal tally first, score column indicates score after each Medvedev goal.

Honours

Qarabağ 
Azerbaijan Premier League: 2013–14, 2014–15, 2015–16, 2016–17, 2017–18, 2018–19, 2019–20, 2021–22
Azerbaijan Cup: 2008–09, 2014–15, 2015–16, 2016–17, 2021–22

Individual
Azerbaijani Footballer of the Year runner-up: 2016, 2018

References

External links
 Maksim Medvedyev profile on Qarabagh.com
 

1989 births
Living people
Footballers from Baku
Azerbaijani footballers
Azerbaijan international footballers
Association football defenders
Qarabağ FK players
Azerbaijan Premier League players
Azerbaijani people of Russian descent